Forbidden dance may refer to:
 Forbidden Dance, a manga series about a high school ballet student
 Lambada,  a dance from Pará, Brazil, of African origin, also known as the "forbidden dance"
 Two rival films released in 1990 about the dance
 Lambada (film)
 The Forbidden Dance